Lakhani may refer to:

 Lakhani (surname), found in Gujarat, India, and among people from Sindh, meaning "(descendant) of Lakh"
 Lakhani, Punjab, a town in the Punjab Province of Pakistan 
 Lakhani, Maharashtra, a town in the Maharashtra state, Bhandara District